Alessandro Antonelli (July 14, 1798 – October 18, 1888) was an Italian architect of the 19th century. His most famous works are the Mole Antonelliana in Turin (named for him) and both the Novara Cathedral and the Basilica of St. Gaudenzio in Novara.

Biography

Antonelli was born in Ghemme, near Novara. He studied in Milan and Turin, and for years he worked in the state territorial planning offices. After winning an architecture contest in the Accademia Albertina, he moved to Rome in 1828, where he studied deep descriptive geometry.

He elaborated a functional ideal of architecture, which inspired him with an ambitious plan of renovation of Turin's historical centre. When he returned there in 1836 (remaining until 1857), he became a professor of the Albertina Academy. He was also a deputy in the Kingdom of Sardinia's Parliament, and a member of Turin's communal council and of the Province of Novara's one. In this period he designed numerous works: several residences, the communal seta and the Sanctuary of Boca (whose cupola was never completed due to crumbling risks), a villa at Romagnano Sesia, the Orphans' Hospice in Alessandria, the regulation plans of Ferrara and Novara, the church of San Clement and the Asilo de Medici in Bellinzago Novarese. The church of Borgolavezzaro (1858–1862) was also finished without the cupola, due to high costs.

Noteworthy is the Basilica of San Gaudenzio in Novara, finished in 1887.  It is an audacious construction in brickwork, standing 121 m tall.  Also from him in Novara are the Casa Bossi and the Cathedral.

Antonelli's most famous work is the Mole Antonelliana, the symbol of Turin, named after him and begun in 1863 as a Jewish synagogue. It was completed in 1897 by the city's council as the Risorgimento Museum. The spire, demolished by a violent cloudburst accompanied by a tornado in 1953, was rebuilt in 1961 according to the original drawings.

Antonelli died in 1888 and was buried in the family cemetery of Maggiora.

References

External links 

 

1798 births
1888 deaths
People from Ghemme
19th-century Italian architects
Accademia Albertina alumni
Academic staff of Accademia Albertina